Sabrina Malheiros (born 1979) is a Brazilian MPB singer/songwriter. Her music has been described as "nu bossa", combining house beats with jazz and samba influences and "cool, detached-sounding vocals", and critics have compared her to Brazilian contemporaries Bebel Gilberto and Céu.

Biography
Malheiros was born in the city of Rio de Janeiro. She is the daughter of Azymuth bassist Alex Malheiros. She was interested in music from a young age, enrolled in music school at age six, and made her first studio recording before age seven. She cites Azymuth and João Gilberto as early influences on her musical style.

Malheiros's first commercially distributed recording was the title track of Azymuth's 1991 album Curumim, on which she sang lead vocals.  Her debut album, Equilibria, was released in 2005. Malheiros wrote or co-wrote nine tracks on the album. Her second album, New Morning, was released in 2008 and was arranged by Arthur Verocai. Both albums were produced by Daniel Maunick and released on the Far Out Recordings label. A remastered and partially reworked "Deluxe Edition" of New Morning was released in 2009, containing a few extra tracks and an increased emphasis on instrumentation.

Malheiros made her UK concert debut on 18 May 2005 at Jazz Cafe in London.

Discography

Albums
2005: Equilibria
2006: Vibrasons
2008: New Morning
2009: New Morning (Deluxe Edition)
2011: Dreaming
 2017: Clareia

Singles and EPs
 2003 – Iemanja (The Mermaid) (12") Remix
 2004 – Estacao Verao (Kenny Dope Remixes) (12") Remix
 2005 – Equilibria (Álbum Sampler) (12") Remix
 2005 – Maracatueira (Incognito Remixes) (12") Remix
 2005 – Passa / Capoeira Vai (12") Remix
 2006 – Terra De Ninguem (Nicola Conte Rework) (12") Remix
 2008 – Connexão (12") Remix
 2015 – Opará (12") (Ashley Beedle's Africanz On Marz Remix) 
 2017 – Clareia Remixes (12") (Henry Wu, Dego-2000 Black & IG Culture Remixes)

Featuring 
 1990 – Curumim – Azymuth (CD) Intima Records
 1998 – Pieces of Ipanema – Azymuth (CD, LP) Far Out Records
 2000 – A Terceira Morte de Joaquim Bolivar (Film/DVD) – Soundtrack
 2001 – V – United Future Organization (CD, LP) Exceptional Records
 2002 – Superágua – Superágua (CD) Zoo Records
 2004 – Brazilian Soul – Azymuth (CD) Far Out Recordings
 2009 – The Wave – Alex Malheiros & Banda Utopia Feat. Sabrina Malheiros (CD, LP) Far Out Recordings
 2009 – Brazilika – Gilles Peterson (CD, LP) Far Out Recordings
 2011 – Aurora – Azymuth (CD, LP) Far Out Recordings
 2012 – Clementine Sun – Khari Cabral Simmons Dome Records
 2015 – Muriel (Série Deluxe) – Sean Khan (CD) Far Out Recordings
2018 – Palmares Fantasy (feat. Hermeto Pascoal) – Sean Khan (CD, LP) Far Out Recordings

References

External links
 
 

1979 births
Living people
Música Popular Brasileira singers
Far Out Recordings artists
21st-century Brazilian singers
21st-century Brazilian women singers